William Thomas Porter, S.M.A.  (14 May 1887 –  16 June 1966) was an English Roman Catholic missionary priest, bishop and archbishop, who served as Vicar Apostolic of Gold Coast and later  Roman Catholic Archdiocese of Cape Coast in present-day Ghana. He was appointed vicar apostolic (as well as titular bishop of Urusi) on 25 April 1933 and archbishop on 18 Apr 1950. He retired as archbishop on 15 May 1959.

Schools
In 1936, Porter established a Roman Catholic secondary school, St. Augustine's College in Cape Coast.
He also established several Roman Catholic youth groups.

References

1887 births
1966 deaths
Roman Catholic missionaries in Ghana
English Roman Catholic missionaries
Cape Coast
British expatriates in Ghana
Gold Coast (British colony) people
20th-century Roman Catholic archbishops in Ghana
British expatriate Roman Catholic archbishops
Roman Catholic archbishops of Cape Coast